A hardstand (also hard standing and hardstanding in British English) is a paved or hard-surfaced area on which vehicles, such as cars or aircraft, may be parked. The term may also be used informally to refer to an area of compacted hard surface such as macadam.

Uses 
Hardstands are found at airports, military facilities, freight terminals, and other facilities where heavy vehicles need to be parked for significant periods of time. They also exist, paved or unpaved, at places where road vehicles are parked.

At airports, hardstands enable airliners to board or offload passengers using stair trucks or mobile ramps, and (on smaller aircraft) built-in airstairs, without needing dedicated jet bridges.

Purpose 
The purpose of a hardstand is to provide a strong surface for stationary vehicles, including where the vehicles may otherwise sink into the ground if left for extended periods of time. A hardstand is configured with a slope for drainage, which with unpaved surfaces serves to slow deterioration.

Construction 

Hardstands are paved with materials including  concrete heavy-duty pavers, which give maintenance flexibility over other products as well as strength for the life of the project; or asphalt; or macadam.  To support the weight of heavy vehicles such as large airplanes, tanks, or heavy trucks, the paving is usually thicker and more durable than in automobile parking lots.

See also 
 Airport apron

References
 

Architectural elements
Civil engineering